John Anthony Cernuto (born January 10, 1944, in Jersey City, New Jersey) also known as Miami, is an American professional poker player based in Las Vegas, Nevada, specialising in Omaha hi-lo events. Cernuto has won over $5,500,000 in live tournament winnings, his largest score was for $259,150 from his $2,000 No Limit Hold'em bracelet victory in the 1997 World Series of Poker.

Early years
Before embarking on his poker career, Cernuto graduated Florida State University as a finance major. After graduating, he worked as an air traffic controller. When President Ronald Reagan fired the air traffic controllers during a 1981 strike, he turned to poker for his profession.

Poker career

World Series of Poker

He first cashed in the World Series of Poker (WSOP) after making the final table in the 1989 World Series of Poker in the $5,000 Seven-card stud event.  He finished fourth in the final table, which featured David Sklansky, Humberto Brenes, Gabe Kaplan, and the tournament winner Don Holt.

Five WSOP cashes followed before Cernuto won his first bracelet in the 1996 WSOP $1,500 seven card stud split tournament. He also won the $2,000 no limit hold'em event in the 1997 World Series of Poker and the $1,500 limit Omaha event in the  2002 World Series of Poker.

Cernuto made an impressive three final tables in the 2006 World Series of Poker, two in Seven Card Stud and one in Razz.

During the $2,500 Razz tournament of the 2009 WSOP, Cernuto collapsed and was taken to a hospital, where he spent the night after being diagnosed with internal bleeding.

At the 2011 World Series of Poker Main Event, Cernuto finished in 345th place  for his best career placement in the World Championship.

As of the 2016 World Series of Poker, Since 1992, Cernuto has finished in the money in at least one World Series of Poker tournament per year. He ranks in the top 15 of all-time WSOP tournament cashers with 65 cashes.

World Series of Poker bracelets

Other poker achievements
In 1988, Cernuto won the $1,000 Seven Card Stud event at Amarillo Slim's Super Bowl of Poker tournament series, earning a cash prize of $58,000 in addition to the title. The victory at the SBOP was Cernuto's first career victory in a major poker tournament.

In 2003, he won the third World Heads-Up Poker Championship in Vienna, outlasting a field including fellow professionals Ivo Donev, Ram Vaswani, Dave Colclough, Scotty Nguyen, and Padraig Parkinson on the way to the €60,000 grand prize.

Cernuto has also made one World Poker Tour (WPT) final table at the 2005 PokerStars Caribbean Poker Adventure event won by John Gale.

Poker Winnings / Accolades
As of 2017, his total live tournament winnings exceed $5,500,000. His 65 cashes at the WSOP account for $1,715,840 of those winnings.

In 2019, actor James Woods, a close friend of John's coined him the “Ironman of Poker”, as John is the all-time leader in poker tournament cashes.

At the 2020 Global Poker Awards John was given the distinguished “Hendon Mob” award for his lifetime tournament cashes record.

Blackjack
Cernuto has made appearances on the Ultimate Blackjack Tour, making a final table in the Elimination Blackjack event where he played in a tournament format of the game of blackjack.

Personal life
Cernuto is divorced. He has a son, Tony, who is also a poker player and a daughter, Deborah.

Notes

External links
Official site
Pokulator 10 Questions Interview

1944 births
American poker players
Living people
Florida State University alumni
World Series of Poker bracelet winners
Super Bowl of Poker event winners
People from Jersey City, New Jersey
People from the Las Vegas Valley
Air traffic controllers